Juan de Zaldívar (c. 1570–1598) was a Spanish soldier and explorer. He was an early colonizer of New Mexico. He was killed by Native Americans.

Early life
Juan de Zaldívar was born circa 1570 in Northern Mexico. His father, Vicente de Zaldívar Sr., served in the Mixtón War of 1540-1542 alongside his uncle (thus Juan's great-uncle), Cristóbal de Oñate. His mother was Magdalena de Mendoza y Salazar. He had a brother, Vicente de Zaldívar. Juan de Oñate was their uncle and second cousin.

Career
In 1595, Zaldívar was asked by his uncle, Juan de Oñate, to serve as his Maestre de Campo, or field marshal, in Oñate's colonization of New Mexico for the Spanish Crown. They departed from Santa Bárbara, Chihuahua in January 1598, arriving in Ciudad Juárez by April of the same year. They went up the Rio Grande, arriving in San Juan de los Caballeros (now known as Ohkay Owingeh, New Mexico) on July 11, 1598.

Death
Zaldívar was killed by Acoma in Acoma Pueblo on December 4, 1598. His brother, Vicente de Zaldívar, won the Acoma Massacre, partly to avenge his death. It is claimed, foot amputation and enslavement of the culprits (Native Americans).

References

1598 deaths
Mexican soldiers
People from Cibola County, New Mexico
Spanish soldiers
Spanish explorers of North America
Explorers of New Mexico
People from Santa Fe, New Mexico
Male murder victims
People murdered in New Mexico
Year of birth uncertain